Tamara Loos is an American historian and gender studies scholar at Cornell University.

Biography
Tamara Loos is Professor of Southeast Asian history at Cornell University and has served as Chair of the History Department and Director of the Southeast Asia Program. Her first book, Subject Siam: Family, Law, and Colonial Modernity in Thailand, explores the implications of Siam's position as both a colonized and colonizing power in Southeast Asia. It is the first study that integrates the Malay Muslim south and the gendered core of law into Thai history. Her most recent book, Bones Around My Neck, offers a critical history of Siam during the era of high colonialism through the dramatic and tragic life of a pariah prince, Prisdang Chumsai. Her teaching and articles focus on an array of topics including sex and politics, subversion and foreign policy, sexology, transnational sexualities, comparative law, sodomy, and gender in Asia. She has been interviewed by The New York Times, The Washington Post, The Financial Times, and other global media outlets about political protests in Thailand.

Radio interviews
 NPR: Thai Palace Officials Ousted Following Demotion Of Royal Consort
 BBC: The Inquiry: Why are Thai students risking jail to call for reform of the monarchy?
 Background Briefing with Ian Masters: Turmoil In Thailand As Subjects Question the King's Excesses and Entitlement

Selected publications

References

21st-century American historians
Historians of Southeast Asia
Historians of Thailand
Historians of sexuality
Cornell University Department of History faculty
Cornell University alumni
Pomona College alumni
21st-century American women writers